The 1958 Sam Houston State Bearkats football team represented Sam Houston State Teachers College (now known as Sam Houston State University) as a member of the Lone Star Conference (LSC)  during the 1958 NCAA College Division football season. Led by seventh-year head coach Paul Pierce, the Bearkats compiled an overall record of 7–3 with a mark of 5–2 in conference play, and finished tied for second in the LSC.

Schedule

References

Sam Houston State
Sam Houston Bearkats football seasons
Sam Houston State Bearkats football